is a limited-edition mini-album by Japanese rock band 9mm Parabellum Bullet released on May 16, 2007. The album contains re-recordings of songs from previous albums as well as two new songs, "The World" and "Heat-Island". The album peaked at 22 on the Oricon charts.

Track listing

PV
The World
Heat-Island

Personnel
Takuro Sugawara – Lead vocals, lyricist, rhythm guitar
Yoshimitsu Taki – Backing vocals, lead guitar
Kazuhiko Nakamura – bass guitar, screaming (tracks 2, 4, and 7)
Chihiro Kamijo – drums

References 

2007 EPs
9mm Parabellum Bullet albums